Lingvisticae Investigationes: International Journal of Linguistics and Language Resources is a peer-reviewed academic journal of linguistics published by John Benjamins Publishing Company. It publishes articles, book reviews, and summaries of PhD theses. The founding editor-in-chief was Maurice Gross (1977–2001). Former editors include Annibale Elia,
Gaston Gross, Christian Leclère, and Elisabete Ranchhod.

The former subtitle of the journal was Revue internationale de linguistique française et de linguistique générale ("International Journal of French Linguistics and General Linguistics"). Contributions are in English or in French. The title means "linguistic research" in Latin.

Abstracting and indexing 
The journal is abstracted and indexed in:

References

External links 
 

Linguistics journals
Multilingual journals
John Benjamins academic journals
Biannual journals